This is a list of mayors of Tukwila, Washington. In 1908, Tukwila was incorporated as a city.  Joel Shomaker, the first mayor, was integral in the movement towards incorporation.  Jim Haggerton was elected mayor in 2007 and assumed office on 1 January 2008.  Reelected to a second term in 2011, he has announced that he will not run for a third.

History
Tukwila was incorporated on 23 June 1908 with Joel Shomaker as mayor.  Shomaker, farm editor for the Seattle Post-Intelligencer, had pushed for the city to be incorporated and planned the newspaper contest that decided the city's name.  Many mayors have had a lasting legacy in Tukwila, where Strander, Minkler, and Baker Boulevards are named after mayors who served in the middle of the twentieth century.

Duties
As an optional municipal code city, Tukwila is governed by Title 35A of the Revised Code of Washington.  As a mayor-council government, the mayor provides over all city council meetings, breaks tied votes, reports as to the city's finances, and prepares the budget.  The mayor has the right to veto ordinances, but that veto can be overridden by a 50%-plus-two majority of the city council.

List of mayors

References

Tukwila
History of Washington (state)
Government of Washington (state)
